Leptobryum is a genus of mosses belonging to the family Bryaceae.

The genus has cosmopolitan distribution.

Species:
Leptobryum acutum (Hedw.) Gugelb. 
Leptobryum patagonicum Broth. 
Leptobryum pyriforme (Hedw.) Wilson

References

Bryaceae
Moss genera